Ambivia is a genus of praying mantids in the subfamily Acromantinae and the tribe Acromantini; species distribution records include Indo-China.

Species
The Mantodea Species File lists:
 Ambivia parapopa Wang, 1993
 Ambivia popa Stal, 1877 (type species?)

References

External links

Hymenopodidae
Mantodea genera
Invertebrates of Southeast Asia
Taxa named by Carl Stål